Ffynnon Lloer (Welsh : Source of [the] Moon) is a lake in the Carneddau range of mountains in Snowdonia, North Wales.

The remains of two wartime aircraft, which crashed in 1942 and 1943, lie on the slopes round the lake.

Afon Lloer, its outflow, flows into Llyn Ogwen.

References

Capel Curig
Lakes of Conwy County Borough
Lakes of Snowdonia